Ellis Ludwig-Leone (born 1989) is an American composer and songwriter based in Brooklyn, New York. Since 2012, he has led the chamber pop group San Fermin with whom he has released four studio albums, most recently 2020's The Cormorant. Outside of San Fermin, he has composed for a wide variety of contemporary classical ensembles and organizations, including New York City Ballet, Indianapolis Symphony Orchestra, and Brooklyn Youth Chorus, and often works with choreographer Troy Schumacher, harpist Lavinia Meijer, Attacca Quartet, and singer-songwriter Allen Tate.

Early life 
Ellis Ludwig-Leone was born in Rhode Island in 1989 and was raised nearby in Berkeley, Massachusetts, a rural community on Massachusetts' South Coast. His parents, who are both painters and former visual arts professors, raised him and his younger sister. Growing up, he studied classical piano and was in a string of high school rock bands. He also played competitive basketball. He met future collaborator and San Fermin-bandmate Allen Tate at a Berklee College of Music summer program when they were both fifteen years old.

Ludwig-Leone subsequently studied classical composition at Yale University, from which he received an undergraduate degree in 2011.

Career 
Ludwig-Leone began composing while studying at Yale, writing music for his bands and ensembles. When he was a junior, he began working as an assistant for composer Nico Muhly with whom he would an establish a lasting professional relationship. After graduating, he took part in an artistic residency at the secluded Banff Centre for Arts and Creativity in Alberta, Canada, during which he wrote most of the material that would become the record San Fermin. The album was released on Downtown Records in 2013 to critical acclaim and prompted the formation of an established eight-person band which has continuously toured since that time. As the group's songwriter and producer, Ludwig-Leone has written three other records for the group, Jackrabbit (2014), Belong (2017), and The Cormorant I & II (2020), among other releases.

Ludwig-Leone has written music for many ensembles including ACME, Colorado Music Festival Orchestra, Decoda, Fifth House Ensemble, Hotel Elefant, JACK Quartet, Metropolis Ensemble, and NOW Ensemble, and was the Composer-in-Residence for the Alabama Symphony Orchestra in their 2015 season. In addition, he has written ballets with choreographer Troy Schumacher for the New York City Ballet and BalletCollective.

In 2020, Ludwig-Leone founded the record label Better Company with Allen Tate and San Fermin manager Thomas Winkler.

Ludwig-Leone's influences include Sufjan Stevens, Miles Davis, Charles Ives, Paul Simon, Nico Muhly, Benjamin Britten, and The National.

Compositions 
Listed as title (year) artist – commissioner (if any).

Chamber
 Four Short Pieces for String Quartet (2011) for JACK Quartet
 Suite for Flute & Harp (2012) for Lavinia Meijer and Herman van Kogelenberg – Lavinia Meijer 
 GROW (2012) for Decoda – Við Djúpið Festival 
 The Impulse Wants Company (2013) for American Contemporary Music Ensemble – BalletCollective
 Dear and Blackbirds (2014) for Hotel Elefant – BalletCollective 
 All That We See (2014) for Hotel Elefant – BalletCollective 
 Invisible Divide (2015) for Hotel Elefant and Vanessa Upson – BalletCollective 
 Until the Walls Cave In (2016) for Hotel Elefant – BalletCollective 
 Simple Machine (2016) for NOW Ensemble – Ecstatic Music Festival 
 Processional for a Doomed Wedding (2020) for Cecilia De Maria – Sony Classical
 Natural History (2020) for The Knights – BalletCollective
 Speech After the Removal of the Larynx (2021) for Attacca Quartet
 False We Hope (2021) for Eliza Bagg and Attacca Quartet

Orchestra
 How to Fake Your Death (2015) – Alabama Symphony Orchestra
 How to Fake Your Death (revision, 2016) –  Indianapolis Symphony Orchestra
 Common Ground (2015) – New York City Ballet
 Shadowy Figures (2019) for Lavinia Meijer – Het Gelders Orkest 

Choir
 Lying in a Field, Age 67 and Singing in a Chorus, Age 14 (2016) – Brooklyn Youth Chorus with Wild Up Orchestra
 Bloom and Round Dance (2017) – Manhattan Choral Ensemble
 Who What When Where Why (and a few other questions) (2018) – The Crossing
 Daphne (2020) – Brooklyn Youth Chorus
 To Look for Owls (2020) for Chamber Choir of Europe – Sony Classical

Solo
 Elaborate Monument (2011) (piano)
 Night Loops (2014) – Lavinia Meijer and Sony Classical
 Simpler Language (2016) – Lavinia Meijer
 Sanctuary (2017) for Simone Dinnerstein (piano) – Terezín Music Foundation

Songwriting
San Fermin (2013) for San Fermin
 Jackrabbit (2015) for San Fermin
"No Devil" (2015) for San Fermin
 "Shiver" (2016) for San Fermin and Sam Amidon; with Sam Amidon 
 Belong (2017) for San Fermin
"Asleep on the Train" (2017) for San Fermin
 The Cormorant I & II (2020) for San Fermin
 In this House (2020) for San Fermin; with various artists

Score
 The Great Work Begins - Scenes from Angels in America (2020) – Ellie Heyman, director
Ledge (short film) (2021) – Alex Edelman, director

Discography

San Fermin 

 San Fermin (2013)
 Jackrabbit (2015)
 Belong (2017); co-produced with Peter Katis
 The Cormorant I & II (2020)

As composer 
Brooklyn Youth Chorus & International Contemporary Ensemble – "Lying in a Field, Age 67" and "Singing in a Chorus, Age 14" from Silent Voices (2016) 
Lavinia Meijer – "Night Loops" from (The Glass Effect (The Music of Philip Glass & Others) (2016) 
Lavinia Meijer & World Choir for Peace – "To Look for Owls" with Gereon Thesis from Peaceful Choir - New Sound of Choral Music (2020)

As arranger 
 Allen Tate – Sleepwalker (2016); also producer
 Pure Bathing Culture – Hats (2020); also featured artist
 Wild Pink – A Billion Little Lights (2021)

References 

American classical composers
American contemporary classical composers
American indie pop musicians
American pop keyboardists
American pop pianists
American music arrangers
People from Berkley, Massachusetts
1989 births
Living people